Eucalyptus pachycalyx, commonly known as the shiny-barked gum, is a species of tree that is endemic to north-eastern Australia. It has smooth, pale grey, mottled bark, lance-shaped or curved adult leaves, white flowers and cup-shaped or hemispherical fruit.

Description
It has smooth, shining, greyish bark with patches of yellow or orange new bark. The flower buds are arranged in groups of seven, nine or eleven on peduncles, usually paired in leaf axils. Flowering has been observed in February and the flowers are white.

Taxonomy
Eucalyptus pachycalyx was first formally described in 1929 by Joseph Maiden and William Blakely in Maiden's book A Critical Revision of the Genus Eucalyptus. The specific epithet (pachyphylla) is from ancient Greek, meaning "thick" and "calyx", referring to the thick-walled fruit.

In 1991, Lawrie Johnson and Ken Hill described two subspecies of E. pachycalyx and in 1997 Hill described a third. The descriptions were published in the journal Telopea and the names have been accepted by the Australian Plant Census:
 Eucalyptus pachycalyx subsp. banyabba K.D.Hill;
 Eucalyptus pachycalyx Maiden & Blakely  subsp. pachycalyx;
 Eucalyptus pachycalyx subsp. waajensis L.A.S.Johnson & K.D.Hill.

Distribution and habitat
Shiny-barked gum grows in open forest on hills near granite outcrops. It occurs in isolated populations from the Atherton Tableland in Queensland, to far north-eastern New South Wales.

Conservation status
Subspecies banyabba is listed as "endangered" under the Australian Government Environment Protection and Biodiversity Conservation Act 1999 and under the New South Wales Government Biodiversity Conservation Act 2016. Subspecies waajensis, which only occurs in Queensland, is classified as "endangered" under the Queensland Government Nature Conservation Act 1992.

References

pachycalyx
Myrtales of Australia
Flora of New South Wales
Flora of Queensland
Trees of Australia
Plants described in 1929
Taxa named by Joseph Maiden
Taxa named by William Blakely